Eulophonotus congoensis is a moth in the family Cossidae. It is found in the Democratic Republic of Congo.

References

Natural History Museum Lepidoptera generic names catalog

Zeuzerinae